Dolichognatha mandibularis is a species of spider in the family Tetragnathidae, found in Sumatra.

References

Tetragnathidae
Spiders of Asia
Spiders described in 1894